Igor Gołaszewski (born 2 March 1968) is a Polish football manager and former player.

References

1968 births
Living people
Polish footballers
Polonia Warsaw players
Śląsk Wrocław players
Association football midfielders
Ekstraklasa players
I liga players
IV liga players
Polish football managers
Świt Nowy Dwór Mazowiecki managers
Polonia Warsaw managers